Ferrell Jack Anderson (January 9, 1918 – March 12, 1978), nicknamed "Andy", was a catcher in Major League Baseball.

Anderson was signed by the New York Yankees in 1939 after spending four years as an all conference football tackle at the University of Kansas. He was purchased by the Brooklyn Dodgers from the Yankees system in 1942. Only a few months into the season he was drafted and went into the Army. He left the service in 1945 and returned to the Dodgers minor league system. He appeared in 79 games for the Dodgers in 1946. He was traded to the Philadelphia Phillies in 1951 and then purchased by the St. Louis Browns. In 1953, he was sold again, this time to the St. Louis Cardinals.  He played in 18 games for the Cards in 1953.

As a Dodger, Anderson caught Ed Head's no-hitter on April 23, 1946.

References

External links

 or Baseball-almanac
Venezuelan Professional Baseball League statistics

1918 births
1978 deaths
Akron Yankees players
United States Army personnel of World War II
Augusta Tigers players
Baltimore Orioles (IL) players
Baseball players from Kansas
Brooklyn Dodgers players
Cervecería Caracas players
Columbus Cardinals players
Durham Bulls players
Fort Worth Cats players
Hagerstown Owls players
Joplin Miners players
Kansas Jayhawks baseball players
Kansas Jayhawks football players
Leones del Caracas players
American expatriate baseball players in Venezuela
Major League Baseball catchers
Minor league baseball managers
Newark Bears (IL) players
Norfolk Tars players
Omaha Cardinals players
People from Cowley County, Kansas
St. Louis Cardinals players
St. Paul Saints (AA) players
Toronto Maple Leafs (International League) players
University of Kansas alumni